This is the list of television programs currently and formerly broadcast by Jaya TV.

Currently broadcast by Jaya TV
Devotional show

 Arul Neram

Breakfast show
 Kaalai Malar

Cooking shows
 Suvaiyo Suvai
 Arusuvai Neram
 Enna Samayalo
 Kai Manam
 Rasikka Rusikka
 Cook with Kutties
 Gama Gama (Kaalai Malar segment)

Annual events
 Margazhi Utsavam

Comedy shows
 Comedy Gangsters

Kids Show

 Vaal Pasanga

Serials
Gopurangal Saivathillai

Formerly broadcast
 Gopurangal Saivathillai 
 Subramaniyapuram
 Sahana
 Shanthi Nilayam
 Akka
Rudhram
 Alaipayuthe
 Jaiyam
 Krishna Cottage
 Roja
 Veetukku Veetukku Looty
 Soundaravalli
 Ranga Vilas
 Adhe Kangal
 Aval Appadithan 
 Carnatic Music Idol USA
 Maya
 Chithiram Pesudhadi
 Kaalabhairavan
 Kalki
 Anni
 Kudumbbam
 Kairasi Kudumbam
 Maayavi
 Ranga Vilas
 Vidathu Sirippu
 Vaidhegi
 Vanthale Maharasi
 Mannan Magal
 Girija MA
 Enge Brahmanan

Dubbed soap operas

 Periya Idathu Penn
 Poonkatru
 Sondhangal
 Jai Veera Hanuman
 Ramayanam
 Poomagal
 Priyamana Thozhi
 Sonnathu Neethanae
 Sree Durga Devi

Cooking shows
 Suvaiyo Suvai
 Arusuvai Neram
 Arokiya Unavu
 Neengalum Samaikalam
 Arusuvai Ithu Thani Suvai

Reality
 Action Superstar
 Comedy Bazaar
 Unnai Arindhaal- with Varalaxmi Sarathkumar
 Vaanameh Yellai- with Apsara Reddy
 Jaya Super Singer South India
 Jaya Super Dancers
 Jaya Star Singer Season 1,2
 Thaka Thimi Tha
 Vaanam Vasappadum 
 Nermugam
 Jil Jung Juk
 Chellame Chellam
 Iniya Illam
 Savaal
 Raagamaliga
 Muhurtha Neram
 Dial Jaya TV
 Housefull
 Raga Vaibhavam
 Visuvin Makkal Arangam
 Sokkuthae Manam
 Ennodu Paattu Paadungal
 Manadhodu Mano
 Kids Q
 Lights Camera Action Cut
 Kodiyin Kural
 A to Z Just for kids
 Vazhthugal
 Hasini-speaking film
 Ari and I
 Little Masters
 Rakamalika
 Tenkinnam
 Music cafe
 Koteeswari
 Jackpot (Season 1,2)
 Bhaktha Vijayam
 Mega Magalir Mattum
 Kichu Kichu.com
 Yen Eppadi Yaar
 Sema Scene Ma
 Take 5
 Jeyikkapovadhu Yaru
 Count Down
 Dhool
 Talk 2
 Oorvalam
 Movie No 1
 Quiz Time
 Cinema Cope
 Cinema Paarvai
 Vanamey Ellai
 Love 2k
 Yes or No
 Anantha Raagam
 Irulin oli
 Galatta Comedy
 Neela Maala
 Kadi Tv
 Veera Muzhakkam
 Vellithirai
 Pop Tucker

List of movies

Kaashmora
Baahubali: The Beginning
Enga Chinna Rasa
Azhagana Naatkal
Azhagarsamy
Chinna Thambi
Orange Mittai
Velayudham
Kaththi
Nilaave Vaa
Veetla Visheshanga
Amma Vandhachu
Eetti
Alexander
En Aasai Machan
Dharma Chakkaram
Illam
Pulan Visaranai
Thalattu Padava
Bharathan
Karuppu Nila
Rajadurai
Sakkarai Devan
Simmasanam
Poonthotta Kaavalkaaran	
Paattukku Oru Thalaivan	
En Aasai Machan	
Gandhi Pirantha Mann
Adhu
Varuvaan Manikandan
Thendral Thodatha Malar
Avvai Shanmugi
Poove Pen Poove
Asokavanam
Kasi
Love Marriage
Kadal Pookkal
Iruvar
Bharathi
Ponnana Neram
Kadhal Rojavae
Nagalingam
Unnai Kann Theduthey
Kunguma Chimizh
Ammaiyappan
Dhaya
Saptham
Nettru Varai Nee Yaaro Naan Yaaro
Guruvamma
Karmegam
Namma Veetu Kalyanam
Jjunction
Album
University
Game
Jaya
Virumbugiren
Kadhal Virus
H2o Kaveri
Pop Corn
Vaseegara
Sena
Dum
Punnagai Poove
Lesa Lesa
Parasuram
Paarai
Ice
Thayumanavan
Vikadan
Eera Nilam
Kaakha Kaakha
Diwan
Success
Unnai Charanadaindhen
Three Roses
Vadakku Vaasal
Ottran
Anjaneya
Nadhi Karaiyinile
Soori
Indru
Sindhamal Sitharamal
Autograph
Aarumugasaamy
Pethi Sollai Thattathe
Udhaya
Kadhal Dot Com
Kavidhai
Maanasthan
Singara Chennai
Arivumani
Oru Murai Sollividu
Vishwa Thulasi
Dreams
Attagasam
Jaisurya
Meesai Madhavan
Ramakrishna
Remote
Image
Iyer IPS
Kannadi Pookal
Sukran
Kadhal Seiya Virumbu
Karagattakari
Sevvel
Priyasakhi
Sachein
Mumbai Xpress
Girivalam
Power of Women
Ullam Ketkumae
Pon Megalai
Chinna
Daas
Ponniyin Selvan
Chidambarathil Oru Appasamy
Kalaiyatha Ninaivugal
Kangalin Varthaigal
Thotti Jaya
Chanakya
Mazhai
Kasthuri Maan
Kanda Naal Mudhal
Thavamai Thavamirundhu
Aahaa Enna Porutham
Neethane En Ponvasantham
Muppozhudhum Un Karpanaigal
Kutty
Nadigan
Vallal
Pick Pocket
Thodari
Bramma
Singaravelan
Rajadhi Raja
Thozhar Pandian
Villadhi Villain
Ullathai Allitha
Mettukudi
Sivasakthi
Senathipathi
Vivaramana Aalu
Sema Ragalai
Paramasivan
Dishyum
Udan Pirappu
 Nizhalgal
 Alaigal Oivathillai
 Valibamey Vaa Vaa
 Oru Kaidhiyin Diary
 Muthal Mariyathai
 Kadalora Kavithaigal
 Vedham Pudhithu
 Kodi Parakuthu
 En Uyir Thozhan
 Pudhu Nellu Pudhu Naathu
Nadodi Thendral
Captain Magal
Kizhakku Cheemayile
Karuththamma
Tamizh Selvan
Chithiram Pesuthadi
June R
Kodambakkam
Thalai Nagaram
Pudhupettai
Kaivantha Kalai
Parijatham
Thalaimagan
Rendu
Innisai Mazhai
Kalyana Kacheri
Kadavulin Theerppu
Karpoora Mullai
Varusham 16
Unnale Unnale
Rasukutti
Aararo Aariraro
Idhu Namma Aalu
Guru Paarvai
Sundara Kaandam
Pullakuttikaaran
Sugamana Sumaigal
Kumbakarai Thangaiya
Ellam Inbamayyam
Azhagiya Theeye
Marumagan
Dhavani Kanavugal
Oomai Janangal
Agal Vilakku
Medhai
Kaadhal Devathai
Uzhavan
Yaar?
Dhikku Theriyadha Kaattil
Surya Paarvai
Thotta Chinungi
Subash
Kathai Kathaiyam Kaaranamam
Pandiyanin Rajyathil
Vietnam Veedu
Aayirathil Oruvan
Murai Maaman
Moovendhar
Manandhal Mahadevan
Veettula Raman Velila Krishnan
Unnai Thedi
Maryan
Aarathi Edungadi
Mannavaru Chinnavaru
Anbulla Kadhalukku
Kalar Kanavugal
Priyamudan
Sivappu Nila
Kathirunda Kadhal
Vaimaye Vellum
Janakiraman
Aranmanai Kaavalan
Mr. Madras
Veluchami
Gokulathil Seethai
Veeram Vilanja Mannu
Unnidathil Ennai Koduthen
Aattanayagann
Uthama Raasa
Jallikattu Kaalai
Chinna Poove Mella Pesu
Gopura Vasalile
Theertha Karaiyinile
Thayagam
Michael Madana Kama Rajan
Maharasan
Musthaffaa
Rajali
Asuran
Pon Vilangu
Idhaya Thamarai
Sathan Sollai Thattathe
Amman Kovil Thiruvizha
Sami Potta Mudichu
Pudhiya Raagam
Vaasalil Oru Vennila
Kalicharan
Vaidehi Vandhachu
Pandithurai
Chinna Thayee
Chinna Marumagal
Idhu Namma Bhoomi
Chinna Muthu
Ilaignar Ani
Kalikaalam
Magudam
Annai Vayal
Senthamizh Paattu
Thirumathi Palanisamy
Chinna Kannamma
Manikuyil
Rasigan
Magudikkaran

External links

Jaya TV
Jaya TV